Davejean is a commune in the Aude department in southern France.

History
Davejean was founded as a small keep at the head of the village, in the heart of the area inhabited by the Cathars.

Population

See also
 Corbières AOC
 Communes of the Aude department

References

Communes of Aude
Aude communes articles needing translation from French Wikipedia